Japfü Christian College (JCC) is a co-educational residential Christian College located at Kipfüzha in the Indian state of Nagaland.

History 
Japfü College was established in 1996. The college takes its name from the nearby Mount Japfü. JCC is located within the Mission Centre of Japfüphiki Baptist Church Council (JBCC) at Kipfüzha, 12 km south of the capital city, Kohima.

Present Day 
The college is equipped with state of the art infrastructures and equipment. It's a residential college for both boys and girls.

Courses Offered 
In the field of studies JCC offers honors courses in English, Economics, Education, History, Political Science and Sociology. The college caters to the Christian Theological studies too.

Faculty 
Dr. Visakhonü Hibo is the Principal of the college. Most of the faculty is local. Dr. Akho Yhokha is the respective Chairman of the Board of Management.

Affiliations and Accreditation 
It is affiliated to the Nagaland University. It is NAAC accredited with CGPA of 2.51 on four point scale at B + grade.

Extra Curriculum 
College has its elite Badminton team by the name ZAPA Shuttlers, which is active on district to inter college level. College actively participates in many sports activities.

See also 
 Christian Colleges and Universities in India

References

External links
Japfü Christian College Official Website

Christian schools in Nagaland
Bible colleges
Christian seminaries and theological colleges in India
Colleges affiliated to Nagaland University
Universities and colleges in Nagaland
1996 establishments in Nagaland
Educational institutions established in 1996